Caloptilia rufipennella (commonly known as small red slender) is a moth of the family Gracillariidae that is found throughout Europe.

It is a small brown Caloptilia  with whitish bands at the top of the forelegs
.
The moth flies from August to the next spring.

The larvae feed on Acer pseudoplatanus.

References

External links
 Lepiforum
 Caloptilia rufipennella at UKmoths
 

rufipennella
Moths described in 1796
Moths of Europe
Taxa named by Jacob Hübner